The filamentous rattail, Gadomus aoteanus, is a rattail of the genus Gadomus, found around New Zealand.

References
 
 Tony Ayling & Geoffrey Cox, Collins Guide to the Sea Fishes of New Zealand,  (William Collins Publishers Ltd, Auckland, New Zealand 1982) 

Macrouridae
Endemic marine fish of New Zealand
Fish described in 1980